A Woman Like You (German: Eine Frau wie Du) is a 1939 German romance film directed by Viktor Tourjansky and starring Brigitte Horney, Joachim Gottschalk and Hans Brausewetter. A young woman lives an unfulfilled life until she falls in love during a holiday abroad.

Cast
 Brigitte Horney as Dr. Maria Pretorius  
 Joachim Gottschalk as Dr. Manfred Thiele 
 Hans Brausewetter as Dr. Paul Hellmer  
 Charlotte Susa as Lyda Lehmann 
 Volker von Collande as Ingenieur Wallrodt  
 Kurt Meisel as Felix Petersen  
 Charlotte Schultz as Fräulein Radtke  
 Albert Florath as Fabrikarzt 
 Hans Leibelt as Wachtmeister  
 Hubert von Meyerinck as Verkäufer im Sportgeschäft  
 Renée Stobrawa as Frau Haucke  
 Eduard Wenck as Herr Haucke  
 Vera Hartegg as Hilde Keller  
 Eric Helgar as Klavierspieler  
 Rudi Schuricke as Klavierspieler  
 Marian Lex as Frau Bahlke  
 Heinrich Kalnberg as Max Hähnchen  
 Hanna Lussnigg as Kitty  
 Leonie Duval as Verkäuferin im Delikatessengeschäft  
 Otto Sauter-Sarto as Waldhüter  
 Margarete Kupfer as Blumenfrau  
 Hanns Waschatko as Krankenhausarzt  
 Fritz Eckert as Assistenzarzt  
 Maria Seidler as Oberschwester  
 Ernst Rotmund as Hotelportier in Venedig  
 Else Reval as Blumenfrau in der Bar 
 Erich Haußmann as Gondoliere  
 Walter Schenk as Oberkellner

References

Bibliography 
 Hake, Sabine. Popular Cinema of the Third Reich. University of Texas Press, 2001.

External links 
 

1939 films
Films of Nazi Germany
German romance films
1930s romance films
1930s German-language films
Films directed by Victor Tourjansky
German black-and-white films
Bavaria Film films
Films shot at Bavaria Studios
1930s German films